Horizon Airport may refer to:

Horizon Airport (El Paso, Texas) in El Paso, Texas, United States (FAA: T27)
Horizon Airport (San Antonio, Texas) in San Antonio, Texas, United States (FAA: 74R)